XENL-AM is a radio station on 860 AM in Monterrey, Nuevo León, Mexico. It is owned by Multimedios Radio and carries a romantic/oldies format known as Radio Recuerdo.

History
XENL received its concession on 15 October 1958. It broadcast with 5,000 watts day and 2,000 watts night under three owners in a ten-year span: Cadena Radiotelevisora del Norte, S.A. (owned by the Serna family); Propulsora del Radio, S.A.; and Canal 86, S.A. upon the Serna family selling it to Multimedios (known then as Organización Estrellas de Oro).

References

External links
XENL Radio Recuerdo Facebook

Radio stations in Monterrey
Multimedios Radio